Broxbourne is a town and former civil parish, now in the unparished area of Hoddesdon, in the Borough of Broxbourne district, in Hertfordshire, England, with a population of 15,303 at the 2011 Census. To the west of the town are Broxbourne Woods, a national nature reserve. The Prime Meridian runs just east of Broxbourne.

Name 
The name is believed to derive from the Old English words brocc and burna meaning Badger stream.

History 
Broxbourne grew around inns on the Great Cambridge Road, now known as the A10. A number of old houses and inns dating from the 16th to the 19th centuries still line the High Street (now the A1170). The Hertfordshire Golf and Country Club is a 16th Century house with later alterations and additions.

The Manor of Broxbourne has an entry in the Domesday Book as Brochtsborne, where Broxbourne Mill is listed. The manor was held in the time of Edward the Confessor by Stigand, the Archbishop of Canterbury, but had passed into Norman hands following the Conquest. King John granted the manor to the Knights Hospitallers until the Dissolution, when it passed to John Cock, after whose family Cock Lane is named.

The parish church of St Augustine was entirely rebuilt in the 15th century, although a 12th-century Purbeck marble font survives. The interior has a number of monuments and brasses dating from the 15th to the 19th centuries. The three stage tower has a belfry with a peal of eight bells, three of which are dated 1615.

The New River which passes through the centre of the town, was constructed in the early 17th century. Broxbourne railway station was built in 1840. A terra cotta works was opened soon afterwards by James Pulham and Son, who specialised in creating artificial rock garden features; some of their work survives in the gardens at Sandringham House and Buckingham Palace.

Pulham House was demolished in 1957. All that remained was one of the six brick kilns and the horse-drawn puddling wheel that ground the terracotta, which are now Grade II listed. The local council originally conserved these in 1986, and in 2016 full conservation was undertaken as part of a joint project between B3Living, Lowewood Museum and Broxbourne Borough Council, with support from the Heritage Lottery Fund.

The area was exploited for its gravel and sand extraction in the twentieth century leaving numerous water-filled lakes. Several of the lakes form part of the Lee Valley Regional Park.

Local government 

Broxbourne was a civil parish in the Ware Rural District from 1894 to 1935. In the latter year the more heavily populated eastern end of the parish was added to the Hoddesdon Urban District, while the rural western portion remained in Ware Rural District, forming part of the civil parish of Brickendon Liberty. In 1931 the parish had a population of 1270.

The former area of Hoddesdon Urban District merged with that of Cheshunt Urban District to form the Borough of Broxbourne in 1974, under the Local Government Act 1972.

The local Member of Parliament is Charles Walker MP, who is from the Conservative party.

Broxbourne now forms one of thirteen wards of the borough, returning three councillors.

Sport and leisure
Broxbourne has a Non-League football club, F.C. Broxbourne Borough, who play at Goffs Lane.

2012 Summer Olympics  
As part of the London 2012 Summer Olympics, Spitalbrook was chosen as the venue for whitewater canoe and kayak slalom events. Subsequently, on 16 April 2008 it was announced that the venue would be built at nearby Waltham Cross and situated on what was (at the time of the relevant press release) the overflow car park for the showground at the River Lee Country Park. The venue was initially known as Broxbourne White Water Canoe Centre and later officially named Lee Valley White Water Centre.

Notable residents
Sir Edward Thackeray, recipient of the Victoria Cross
Broxbourne's Hedgegrove Farm was home to Dina St Johnston, who founded the UK's first independent software house.
Charles Deville Wells, known as ″the man who broke the bank at Monte Carlo" (born in Broxbourne High Road in 1841). He was baptised by the Rev. Francis Thackeray, who was an uncle of the writer William Makepeace Thackeray and father of Sir Edward Thackeray (see above).
Pat Jennings, goalkeeper who played for Watford, Tottenham Hotspur, Arsenal and Northern Ireland.
Ray Clemence, goalkeeper who played for Tottenham Hotspur, Liverpool and England.
Osvaldo Ardiles, Midfield who played for Tottenham Hotspur and Argentina.
Gillian Taylforth, actress
Richard Watts, nineteenth-century printer to the University of Cambridge, and of non-Roman scripts.
Elizabeth Maconchy, composer

See also
Broxbourne railway station
Cannix
The Broxbourne School

References

 
Towns in Hertfordshire
Former civil parishes in Hertfordshire
Hoddesdon